Lala Mehmed Pasha (died 28 November 1595) was an Ottoman military commander and Grand Vizier of the Ottoman Empire under the reign of Mehmed III.

Born in Gölmarmara in western Anatolia, he became a lala (tutor) to the Sultan Murad III and then to his son Mehmed III, hence his nickname. After having married the daughter of Mehmed III's daye (wet nurse) Halima Khatun, Mehmed Pasha rose to serve as Grand Vizier in 1595, the first year of Mehmed III's reign, although only for a matter of few days before he suddenly died. His lineage continued for centuries, coming all the way to Husein Avni Pasha.

See also
 List of Ottoman Grand Viziers

References

1595 deaths
Turks from the Ottoman Empire
16th-century Grand Viziers of the Ottoman Empire
Lalas (title)
Year of birth unknown
People of the Long Turkish War